Temnora elisabethae is a moth of the family Sphingidae. It is known from forests from Congo to Uganda.

The length of the forewings is 21–24 mm. The forewings, head and body are dark grey. The forewings have a large dark brown triangular spot at the middle of the costa. There is a smaller dark brown spot at the costa, before the apex. There are numerous irregular dark
narrow transverse lines. The hindwings are uniform very dark brown. The underside is bright pinkish buff lined with fuscous. The abdominal tufts are pink.

References

Temnora
Moths described in 1930
Insects of Cameroon
Insects of the Democratic Republic of the Congo
Insects of Uganda
Fauna of the Central African Republic
Fauna of Gabon
Moths of Africa